Aztec Mountain is a small pyramidal mountain over  high, just southwest of Maya Mountain and west of Beacon Valley in Victoria Land. It was so named by the New Zealand Geological Survey Antarctic Expedition (1958–59) because its shape resembles the pyramidal ceremonial platforms used by the Aztec and Maya civilizations.

See also
 Altar Mountain
 Maya Mountain

References
 

Mountains of Victoria Land
Scott Coast